Price Devereux, 9th Viscount Hereford (1664 – 3 October 1740) of Vaynor Park, Montgomeryshire and Ombersley Court, Worcestershire was a British Peer.

He was the son of Price Devereux (who died before his own father in 1666) and grandson of Sir George Devereux, younger brother of Walter Devereux, 5th Viscount Hereford (1578–1658). He succeeded to his grandfather's estate at Vaynor Park in 1682 and to the viscountcy in 1700 when Edward Devereux, 8th Viscount Hereford died without an heir.

He was Member of Parliament for Montgomery from 1691 until his succession in 1700.  He was Custos Rotulorum of Montgomeryshire from 1711 to 1714.

He married in 1683 Mary, the daughter of Samuel Sandys of Ombersley Court, Worcs and was succeeded by their only son Price Devereux, 10th Viscount Hereford.

References

 John Debrett, Debrett's Peerage of England, Scotland, and Ireland (1820)
 Welsh Biography Online

1664 births
1740 deaths
Devereux, Price
Price 09
Price
English MPs 1690–1695
English MPs 1695–1698
English MPs 1698–1700